The Triyampawai Ceremony, the  Hindu ritual celebrated currently in Bangkok Devasathan temple, was one of the 12 months' royal ceremonies of Thailand which is identified with Tamil Thiruvempavai of Tamils.

History 
It is believed that Thiruvembavai was introduced to Thailand by Tamils who immigrated to then Siam in 14th century CE..  Available  historical evidences confirm that the ritual of Thiruvembavai has been observed at  Ayutthaya, Sukhothai and Sawankhalok, the ancient capitals of Thailand.  Initially it was observed as a penance and fasting at Sawankhalok and Phitsanulok and later it got royal patronage and became one of the 12 royal ceremonies combined with the swing ceremony.

Rituals 

Triyamphway was celebrated to praise the Hindu god Siwa who was believed to come visit Thailand at the end of every Thai year. He was offered with rice, fruits and vegetables.  Great Swing ceremony was celebrated to make him happy at the well known Sao Chingcha. So many Thai folklores interpret the connection between Siwa and Swing with interesting explanations.  After ten days, it was believed that the companion of Siwa, Narai visits and blesses Thailand for five days. 

Triyamphway mantra, actually Tamil Thiruvempavai stanzas of Saint Manikkavasagar was recited in these days. The first 11 stanzas recited in front of Siwa are known as ""Pothmurai yay" while the other 9 stanzas recited in front of Narai are known as "Pothmurai clang". The two main deities of Saivism and Vaishnavism are praised by single Thiruvembavai of Manikkavasagar, which is a saivite literature.

Swing ceremony 
Swing ceremony was grandly celebrated in Thailand until the reign of King Rama VII. After that it was cancelled due to reasons such as the break down in the Swing, injuries at Swing ceremony and the unbearable great cost to Thai government following World War II.  Abandoned Great swing still can be seen in front of Wat Suthat  of Phra Nakhon, Bangkok. Present day, Triyamphway is celebrated indoors in Dewasathan temple of Bangkok. The last day of the rite is offering to Buddha to align with the Buddhist perspectives of Thailand.

References 

Ceremonies in Thailand